Groups of animals and humans that live in places with high population density have an increased risk of disease prevalence. In looking at sociality and disease transmission, an examination of how social grouping strategies may reduce or increase the spread of disease is critical for the health of large groups of people. Social groups, community structures, and cultures affect the use of different strategies and behaviors to reduce the spread of disease.

Large groups can help reduce the spread of disease by having clean, uncontaminated water and food supplies. Another way groups can reduce the spread of disease is through avoiding contact with individuals in the community that are ill. For example, social distancing, utilized during the COVID-19 pandemic, is an infection control technique that involves maintaining physical distance and reducing close contact between individuals.

Non-human social groups and disease transmission 
Studies have generated very mixed results regarding pathogen risk and prevalence in animal communities. One of the earliest measurements of a correlation between pathogen prevalence and animal social groups is in prairie dog wards. It was found that as the size of the ward increased, the abundance of parasites in the burrow also increased.

Several studies that followed have also supported this finding that an increase in community size and density produces an increase of risk and prevalence of pathogenic infection. Vector-borne parasites as well as parasites transmitted by direct social contact appeared to correlate positively in number with the density of a population. In a recent meta-analysis of the data, Patterson and Ruckstahl confirmed that "parasite intensity and prevalence both increased positively with group size…" with the caveat of mobile parasites, which displayed a negative correlation between group size and infection intensity. Møller et al. speculate that animals have evolved behaviors to mitigate the pathogenic risk of living in social groups. This includes grooming, rotating roost sites, mate selection, and aggressive behavior that is thought to reveal the presence of a depressed immune system in an individual.

Not all research has supported this connection between pathogens and sociality, however. In fact, an abundance of information on social mammals as well as avian groups has drawn the exact opposite conclusion. Higher hemocyte and phenol oxidase levels were measured in solitary species than in socially organized ones in one study.

Similarly, Snaith et al. (2008) found that large social groups had even fewer parasites and they also measured lower levels of cortisol, a stress hormone that reduces immune function. Viral presence in scale-free networks without communities is higher, and in fact, the stronger the community structure of the animals is, the less likely a new outbreak will occur. This information has stimulated inquiry into the various social structures that characterize animals. A few reasons for the contrary findings have been speculated. Due to the complex nature of social groups, studies that sample pathogen presence frequently fail to account for the fission-fusion nature that characterizes them: conflicts occur, new social bonds are made or die out, births and deaths of individuals occur, groups or individuals may migrate, networks may overlap or else be quite far apart from one another. Social groups are far from being stagnant and single measurements of pathogen presence can easily have misleading results.

Wilson et al., 2003, also highlight the importance of accounting for shared ancestry among animals, which includes recent genetic relation as well as phylogenetic relationships. Parasite-host co-evolution is also important to consider, which may lead to an endemic presence of a pathogen in a group, or conversely, an immunity. Many other factors confound the dynamics of social groups and pathogen spread that will be examined in the "Challenges" section.

Community structures of social animals and implications for contagious infections 
Griffin and Nunn's (2012) article on community structure simulated the introduction of a pathogen into various group structures and communities. Ultimately, "increased modularity mediates the elevated risk of parasitism associated with living in larger groups". Such structures are composed of nodes that may represent an individual or a unit of individuals in a group who have ties to other nodes. If the community structure is strong, the eigenvector (here represented as a pathogen) will experience a dying-out effect,

In geometrical structures of communities, a point represents a node, and a line between two nodes represents a social tie or interaction. In certain structures, the eigenvector may pass from one group to another, but the chances are limited. If a node is said to represent an individual, we can imagine that three potential outcomes will occur once that node has been infected.
 The individual may die, may become immune to future infection by the pathogen,
 or may live with the disease chronically until it is shed.

In the first two outcomes, the pathogen will begin to experience a dying-out effect and transmission will begin to weaken.

Wey et al. (2008) note that not all nodes are equal in weight within the community's structure, and therefore their level of risk for both reception and transmission may vary heavily. Furthermore, this "weight" of an individual can have interesting implications for transmission if a "key individual" is removed from the structure. An extreme consequence of the removal of a key individual could be the collapse of the structure, but also may mean the loss of a "super-spreader", which is an individual with many ties inside a community as well as ties to other communities. Super-spreaders may be measured by their high levels of in-degree and out-degree numbers. In-degree is a reflection of the susceptibility of a node because it is a measurement of all the social ties a node is the recipient of, whereas out-degree is a reflection of the contagiousness of a node because it is a measurement of all the social ties generating from that node.

Challenges 
In addition to the natural factors that make measuring true pathogen risk and prevalence difficult (mentioned above) are behaviors like mate selection, stress-hormone levels, degree of promiscuity in a group, and diet. Consideration of the effects humans have had on animal populations, both directly and indirectly, are paramount to understanding the spread of pathogens.

Altizer et al. (2003) mention habitat fragmentation, crowding of animals onto wildlife reserves, and encroachment upon formerly wild lands that leads to increases in contact between wildlife and domesticated species as well as humans. More generally, Daszak et al. (2000) would include climate change as a tremendous confounding factor. We might furthermore speculate that certainly tourism and poaching have contributed their own to the contagion paradigm.

Human social groups 
Humans are surprisingly predictable when it comes to the range of possible social group structures. We occupy less than half of the social network structures that characterize non-human primates; however, among primates we can be found to comfortably reside in the largest gamut for any one species.

A few other notable characteristics make humans unique when considering community structure.
 Humans are the only primates that keep consanguineal relationships, even after departure from a natal group, and retain ties with kin living in different social groups. Although some non-human primates form temporary groups of "roaming bachelors", these social groups do not come anywhere near the fairly common social structures of permanent religious celibates.
 Some other examples of aberrant community and social structures in humans include men or women absenting for long periods in war or trade, "raiding" for wives that results in total displacement, eunuchs, and isolated stigmatized groups (criminals, lepers, etc.).
 A further oddity to consider regarding human social behavior is the "creation" of kin out of unrelated individuals, including the nomination of "godparents", step-families, and exceptionally close friends that assume a role of a relative.

All of these examples have complicated effects on the measurement and understanding of pathogenic propagation within the human realm.

Human social groups and disease implications 
Invasion by a pathogen in any community, human or otherwise, requires a two-step process. 
 First, there must be importation of the pathogen by means of migration. This may occur through a traveling node, or a vector, or may occur when an entire community relocates.
 Second, the number of infections must rise due to the social contacts within that population.

For humans, this process can appear extremely chaotic. "Local public sites with extremely high population density such as train stations, or large social, political, or religious mass gatherings are regarded as high-risk…".
In addition to those mentioned by Hu et al., 2013, we can add airports, schools, camps, and holiday shopping bedlam. An exceptionally important note to make here is that these heavily dense situations involve mainly strangers, as opposed to close social contacts that operate in a structured network. Especially with respect to modern technological advances that allow us to do such things as pass over enormous geological features, it would appear we are ripe for constant global pandemic. We are left to wonder, then, how human society can possibly persist so fruitfully considering the constant violations we make of strong community structures that would act as a buffer. Before examining research that addresses that question, it is important to acknowledge and understand the interwoven nature of human culture and epidemiology.

Cultural gatherings and risk 
The first large human social activities, trailed by major disease outbreaks that have been documented occurred by fecal-oral route. Contaminated food or water by fecal matter can cause devastating effects and spread with extreme rapidity. They are, of course, not the only types of infection that threaten large gatherings of people. Respiratory infections, sexually transmitted infections, and measles have all been measured as potential infections resulting from mass gatherings.

Social gatherings that have been linked to outbreaks include the 1918 Spanish flu pandemic, the 1957–1958 influenza pandemic, a 1987 outbreak of multi-drug resistant shigellosis in North Carolina that infected over 50% of event attendees, a 1992 outbreak of Campylobacter in the UK, a 1993 Hepatitis A outbreak at a youth camp in Australia, two separate outbreaks  of meningococcal meningitis at the 2000 and 2001 Hajj, a 2008 influenza outbreak in Sydney, the 2009 H1N1 pandemic (which followed a large Easter gathering in Mexico).

Rainey et al. (2016) identified a total of 72 mass-gathering related respiratory outbreaks between 2005 and 2014. Many of these outbreaks led to further outbreaks within the cities that infected individuals returned home to after the events. Particularly the epidemiological consequences of the Hajj are notable because of the range of dissemination that attendees have when they return from the pilgrimage. Infected individuals may return to their homes far from the source of the outbreak, and into communities that are especially vulnerable to a disease not characteristic of that community. Health response teams may be less equipped to manage the spread of the foreign pathogen, and the people may be less knowledgeable about risks and symptoms. Diseases such a tuberculosis have long incubation periods, which creates another obstacle since it separates the point of infection from the start of illness and therefore obscures the connection.

Intervention and mitigation are possible for such large events, but involve very expensive and complex measures. Vaccinations are highly effective, but it is extremely costly to attempt to vaccinate large hordes of individuals. In a study of livestock populations, Hu et al., 2013 observed important patterns for vaccination efforts. When deaths from infection occur, or a method of culling is used, social networks will alter and individuals will spread out. Because of this, carefully designed vaccination efforts are significantly more effective and cheaper and must be implemented as fast as possible in order to contain the pathogen.

Relatively new methods, such as tracking mobile phone data, have been used to glean information on effective strategies for containment in the situation of mass gatherings. Finger et al. (2016) state "human mobility is undisputedly one of the main spreading mechanisms of infectious disease". In their study, cell phone data was used to track the migration of people for the Grand Magal of Touba, a religious pilgrimage event that occurs in Senegal. Figure 6 illustrates the findings of this study and identifies areas that are paramount for targeting in an epidemiological prevention effort.

Behavioral immune system 
Schaller and Park (2011) used the term "behavioral immune system" to account for observable activities that humans utilize in the face of pathogen threat. Whereas non-human social animals appear to largely rely upon distinctly organized social structures to combat the threat of diseases, it is evident such systems would be strained to apply in most modern human societies.

The study describes "perceptual cues" that humans use that will trigger aversive behavior toward other individuals. For example, people who appear to be ill may stimulate avoidance behavior in those around them, particularly if the others around them have temporarily suppressed immune systems. Wilson et al., 2003, speculated that gregarious species may invest less overall in their immune functions because so many of the body's resources must go to support somatic growth and competition among mates.

One potential explanation, therefore, for human hypersensitivity to the perception of disease threat is that we are left relatively vulnerable by our under-provisioned immune systems. Schaller and Park (2011) also make a connection between the experience of disgust and things that do pose actual threat of pathogen risk, however this "disgust" experience has a tendency to be over-applied rather than under-applied in the favor of the individual's health and is therefore triggered by things that resemble disgust-inducing objects or actions. Such research has enormous implications for the explanation of aspects ranging from cultural diet variance to conformity and xenophobia.

Schaller and Murray (2008) ran a comparison against research by Grunier et al. (2004) that displayed the variability of the prevalence of pathogens on a geographic scale. Schaller and Murray (2008) found overlap in cultural differences that included food preparation, mate selection and family structure, and sociosexual practices. In regions where infectious disease threat was lower, people trended toward more liberal sexual practices, more extroverted personalities, and less "self-conscious" behavior. In the 2011 article "the Behavioral Immune System", the authors discuss how avoidance behaviors can also be triggered when an individual witnesses another individual violating social norms, hence a general trend toward ethnocentrism and wariness of foreigners. Especially during times of known pathogenic outbreak, this can be so extreme as to manifest itself in the form of xenophobia. Wu and Chang's 2011 study elucidated trends toward conformity that they believe may have evolved as a protective dynamic against the introduction of contagions.

Although research in this area is still very new, it provides a logical and cogent connection between particulars of human sociality and disease transmission. It furthermore stimulates key insight into cultural dynamics that assist in human survival.

References 

Infectious diseases